Ulm Ost station is a railway station in the eastern part of the town of Ulm, located in Baden-Württemberg, Germany.

References

Ost